Humanity: An International Journal of Human Rights, Humanitarianism, and Development is a peer-reviewed academic journal which focuses on human rights, humanitarianism, and development in the modern world. Contributions come from the fields of anthropology, law, literature, history, philosophy and politics. The journal is published triannually by the University of Pennsylvania Press. It was established in 2010 and the current coeditors are Ayça Çubukçu (London School of Economics), Tobias Kelly (University of Edinburgh), Angela Naimou (Clemson University), Vasuki Nesiah (The Gallatin School), Timothy Nunan (Free University of Berlin), and Jessica Whyte (University of New South Wales).

Current issues of Humanity are available electronically through Project MUSE.

External links

Human rights journals
Publications established in 2010
Triannual journals
English-language journals
Development studies journals
University of Pennsylvania Press academic journals